Barry Morton Gough is a global maritime and naval historian recognized for the range and quality of his body of work. He is a biographer, having written the lives of such diverse persons as the mariner Juan de Fuca, the fur trading organizer Peter Pond, and the intrepid trans-continental explorer Sir Alexander Mackenzie. He has examined the lives of rival British naval historians Arthur Marder and Captain Stephen Roskill, and more recently, as an analyst of British naval history, has written the interlocking lives of the titans at the admiralty, Admiral Lord Fisher and Prime Minister Winston Spencer Churchill, whose work was essential to Britain's maintenance of sea supremacy in the First World War. Gough has made several contributions to ethnohistory, cross-cultural relations, patterns of missionary acceptance among Northwest Coast peoples, frontier–borderland studies and environmental history. With the perspective of British sea power worldwide, he has set out the maritime dimensions of British Columbia history and has worked to recast and reaffirm the imperial foundations of Canadian history.

Education
The pattern of a working historian's experiential learning was set in early school years and continued. Guest lectureships subsequently took him to Duke, Otago, Singapore, Canberra, Natal, Belfast and other universities. "I was born in 1938, and as soon as peace came, in 1945, my family was able to begin its annual summer camping expeditions. I am an islander, having been born and raised in Victoria, Vancouver Island. Each summer we went far afield — up into the Cariboo country, into the Rockies, down into central, arid Washington State, followed the tortuous Columbia River on both sides of the border, hiked in the fabulous Olympic Mountains and Mount Rainier, etc. I was inspired by the variety and majesty of this remarkable quarter of North America. And I saw it before much despoliation. There is another reason: my father was an author, besides being a Superintendent of Schools in Victoria. He was writing school texts in geography and history.... Our travels helped him scope out the land and its history."

Gough was educated at Victoria High School and was a 1957 graduate of Victoria College, which preceded University of Victoria. He completed his undergraduate degree at University of British Columbia and master's studies at University of Montana. Earning his PhD at King's College London, he was tutored in the maritime foundations of imperial history by Gerald S. Graham, Rhodes Professor of Imperial History in the University of London. His doctoral research on seapower and geopolitics across the Pacific Rim became the inaugural publication in 1971 of the University of British Columbia Press: The Royal Navy and the Northwest Coast of North America, 1810–1914: A Study of British Maritime Ascendancy.  Former Dominion Archivist W. Kaye Lamb remarked that "author and publisher alike have set a high standard for the publications of the new Press." An expanded edition was later published by Heritage House as Britannia's Navy on the West Coast of North America, 1812–1914.

Years after the earned doctorate, Gough was awarded an honorary Doctorate of Literature from University of London in 1991 for distinguished contributions to Imperial and Commonwealth history. In June 2021, University of Victoria conferred on him another doctorate, an Honorary Doctor of Laws.

Teaching and consulting
Initially returning to Victoria High School as teaching staff, Gough became in turn Lecturer, Assistant and associate professor at Western Washington University in Bellingham, Washington, and co-director of the Centre for Pacific Northwest Studies. From 1972 to 2004 in the history faculty at Wilfrid Laurier University, Waterloo, Ontario, he was named associate professor, then Professor and University Research Professor. He was founding director of Canadian Studies at Laurier and served as coordinator of Interdisciplinary Studies and Assistant Dean of Arts. The material in a series of public lectures he organized was published with his introduction as In Search of the Visible Past.

During that period of teaching and multiple fellowships, his conversations with anthropologists and ethnologists were part of the shaping of the Laurier Conference on Ethnohistory in 1981 and, working with the Canadian Historical Association, to creation of the Aboriginal History Studies Group in 1982. The papers presented at the Second Laurier Conference on Ethnohistory and Ethnology, held 11–13 May 1983 at University of Western Ontario, encompassed research by scholars on North American native peoples that was important in breaking new ground on cross-disciplinary lines at a time aboriginal rights in Canada were being recognized in the Charter of Rights and Freedoms. The material was later published as New Dimensions in Ethnohistory: Papers of the Second Laurier Conference on Ethnohistory and Ethnology.

Gough designed a two-semester course in native studies within the university and followed that strong interest in his subsequent work. He was asked to prepare a historical legal claims dossier for the Tribal Council of the Nuu Chah Nulth in the Meares Island case (Moses Martin et al. v H.M. the Queen) in 1985  and later, on behalf of the U.S. Department of Justice, to prepare materials on the Alaska inland waters case, Alaska v the United States of America (2005).

His writings, including young adult non-fiction and coursework for civilian and military personnel, are used in various teaching contexts. His Great Lakes shipwrecks research led to involvement with HMCS Haida and him becoming the ship's official historian. Gough was advisory editor to Macmillan Publishing for World Explorers and Discoverers (1992) and to Scribner's for Explorers: From Ancient Times to the Space Age (1998), and he was editor-in-chief of the magazine American Neptune based at the Peabody Essex Museum in Massachusetts (1997–2003). Following publication of From Classroom to Battlefield, he wrote guidelines for community groups or classes of students to draft manuscripts about Canadian high schools and the First World War: the approach and methodology of the historian, materials available for use, and suggestions for giving individuals' stories their historical contexts.

At his retirement from WLU after thirty-three years, Gough was appointed University Professor Emeritus and moved from Ontario to his Victoria childhood home to engage with the community and continue writing. Since 2007, he has been adjunct professor of War Studies and History, Royal Military College of Canada in Kingston, Ont.

In October 2020, Professor Gough was lead speaker at a symposium sponsored by the Churchill Archives Centre, Churchill College, Cambridge, commemorating the life and legacy of Admiral Lord "Jacky" Fisher. The event marking the centenary of Fisher's death and the transfer of new material to the centre was filmed and posted online.

On Winston Churchill's birthday in November 2020, the Faculty of Humanities at University of Victoria announced a signal honour: the new Churchill Foundation Vancouver Island Barry Gough Scholarship in English. Churchill won the Nobel Prize for Literature 1953 for his multi-volume History of the English-Speaking Peoples, and this endowed scholarship acknowledging eloquent and engaged citizenship was created to support academically outstanding undergraduate English students in their upper years of study who demonstrate leadership, innovation and determination in a combination of academic work and community engagement. Gough has supported the creation of a number of scholarships.

Affiliations and affinities
Gough is a former president of the British Columbia Historical Federation and  after his term was named BCHF honorary president, an "ambassadorial" or "historian laureate" role he characterizes as "a sort of spokesman and advocate for B.C. history." The federation of ninety-nine member societies and roughly 25,000 members works to recognize historical preservation work being done through local museums, archives, collections and special projects, and honours those involved.

Gough is Past President of the Canadian Nautical Research Society, Past President of the Sir Winston Churchill Society of Vancouver Island, and past member of the Board of Academic Advisers, The Churchill Centre, Chicago. He is Past President of the North American Society for Oceanic History, Past President of the Organization for the History of Canada, and Past Vice-president of the Champlain Society of Canada. In the Ontario years, he was President of the Rotary Club of Kitchener and, after his return to B.C., resumed active participation as chair, Victoria High School Alumni Association.

He worked with the Vancouver Maritime Museum as curator for the Vancouver 125 exhibition, "Captain George Vancouver" (2011), and was advisor to the Maritime Museum of BC, Victoria, on projects such as "War of 1812 in the Pacific" (2012). Continuing as historical consultant to CFB Naval and Military Museum, Esquimalt, B.C., he was in 2017 curator of the Canada 150 Public History Project, "The Royal Canadian Navy and the Pacific Gateway to Wider Seas." A corresponding video production was released the following year as Our Seas Our Coasts Our Navy.

He is a Life Member of the Association of Canadian Studies, founding member of the Association for Canadian Studies in the United States and past Chair of the Joint Committee of the American Historical Association and the Canadian Historical Association. He is president of the book selection committee of the Society for the History of Navy Medicine, based at the U.S. Naval Academy in Annapolis, Maryland. He lectures on maritime and naval topics, on Canadian history and public affairs, and since the 1970s has served on the editorial boards of a number of scholarly journals, including BC Studies: The British Columbian Quarterly and Terrae Incognitae: The Journal of the Society for the History of Discoveries.  In November 2019, he was named a Fellow of the Society for the History of Discoveries.

A lifelong jazz clarinetist, he has been a member of the non-profit society Universal Jazz Advocates and Mentors (U-JAM) for many years. Gough was 2012 president, performed 22 June 2014 at the TD Victoria International JazzFest, and continues to mentor.

Awards and medals
Barry Gough and his writings have received honours, awards and prizes in the United States, the U.K., Spain and Canada.

The British Maritime Foundation announced in November 2015 that Pax Britannica: Ruling the Waves and Keeping the Peace before Armageddon won the Mountbatten Literary Award 2015 for best literary contribution to the understanding of the importance of the seas. "I've always felt the seas were blindsided in the writing of Canadian history, and I have made it my own particular calling to turn that around," Gough said in 1994.

The highest award bestowed by the Washington State Historical Society, the Robert Gray Medal for lifetime achievement, was given to Gough in September 2016.

On behalf of the Naval Association of Canada, Dr. Gough, FRHS, was presented with the 2019 Admirals’ Medal by Admiral (retired) John Anderson, RCN. An Admirals’ Medal is bestowed upon individual Canadians in recognition of  their outstanding achievements in the advancement of maritime affairs in Canada. The silver medal was presented at a luncheon of the Vancouver Island branch of the association in recognition of his lifetime achievement as a global maritime and naval historian "through some thirty major volumes and numerous articles, …a body of work which has earned him international acclaim as a Canadian scholar of the highest order."

A life member of the Society for the History of Discoveries, Gough was in November 2019 named a Fellow of the Society "for his many outstanding publications in Canadian and British imperial and naval history; for his fine record of teaching and mentoring students, particularly at Wilfrid Laurier University; and for his contributions to the scholarly community of imperial, international and maritime historians...."

Gough has received the Psi Upsilon Distinguished Service Alumnus Award, the Wilfrid Laurier University Alumni Hoffmann-Little Award for Outstanding Teaching, and the Distinguished Alumni award in 2019 from the University of Victoria.

For civic contributions in both Ontario and British Columbia, he received the Queen Elizabeth II Golden Jubilee Medal and the Queen Elizabeth II Diamond Jubilee Medal.

In November 2014, Her Honour Judith Guichon, Lieutenant-Governor of British Columbia, presented him with the Maritime Museum of B.C.'s 2014 SS Beaver Medal for Maritime Excellence.

Prizes have included the Clio Prize of the Canadian Historical Association and medals, awards and honourable mentions from a number of organizations: the North American Society for Oceanic History, the Writers Trust of Canada Non-Fiction Prize, the Roderick Haig-Brown Regional Prize, B.C. Book Prizes, and the Lieutenant-Governor's Medal for Historical Writing given by the British Columbia Historical Federation. The Hallmark Heritage Society of Victoria chose Vic High alumni Gough's study of teachers and students in the Canadian Expeditionary Force, From Classroom to Battlefield: Victoria High School and the First World War, for its 2015 Communication Award.

Published works
As historian and educator, Gough has shared the maritime history of the Pacific Northwest and of the continent's interior and northern regions, presenting British Columbia in a worldwide context. His dissertation, the basis of his first book, argued that British Columbia owed its existence to British sea power, that the Hudson's Bay Company was not the only agent in the commercial and political project of creating British Columbia's boundaries: "Russian rivalry on the north and American expansion into Oregon, by settlement and political design, prompted the British response.... The Navy based at Esquimalt became the main agency supporting colonial government, hydrographical surveying, and cross-cultural relations." His investigations of early navigation in the Strait of Juan de Fuca and Strait of Georgia resulted in publication of Charles Duncan's long-neglected plan and elevation of Cape Flattery and Fuca's Pillar, charted by Duncan in August 1788 and first published in 1790.

Gough's 1997 account of Sir Alexander Mackenzie's overland explorations to the Arctic and Pacific coasts, First Across the Continent, continues as a central contribution to the study of North American exploration in the 18th and 19th centuries. The explorer's journey across the Great Divide to the Pacific, following indigenous pathways and guided by their knowledge and European navigational science, is also examined at some length in Canada's History magazine. Mackenzie, the "Scottish-born son of Loyalists, is spurred on through his exploratory ambitions by the eccentric and aptly named Peter Pond, a Connecticut Yankee with similar interests in travelling and the fur trade, and whose early maps of tributaries and rivers led many to believe he had indeed found the fictitious Northwest Passage."

Press coverage of the pending auction of an 18th-century pistol engraved with Peter Pond's name drew new attention to The Elusive Mr. Pond, Gough's study of the soldier, fur trader and explorer, historically important in pushing northwest into the Mackenzie River basin and establishing the North West Company. "He presciently forecast," said Gough in an interview, "a transcontinental Canada linking the St. Lawrence with the Pacific, all based on trade and under the British flag."

Pax Britannica in 2014 explored the intersection of British naval reach and the guarding of imperial commerce during the post-Napoleonic century.

Britannia's Navy two years later documented within a global context a century of events in the North Pacific, the further evolution of the strategic Esquimalt naval base and jurisdictional disputes and developments vis-à-vis the U.S.

Churchill and Fisher: Titans at the Admiralty (2017) received early acclaim as an inquiry into the role of personality in the making of history: the administration of the Royal Navy in the Great War by First Sea Lord Admiral Sir John ("Jacky") Fisher and his young political master, First Lord Winston Churchill.

In The Times Literary Supplement, Jan Morris wrote: "This enthralling book by an eminent Canadian naval historian is a work of profound scholarship and interpretation…. Barry Gough has himself heightened the book's sense of personal drama by surrounding his central characters with powerful expositions of the state of the world around them." James Wood in The Ormsby Review leads with the Morris comments, then attends to Gough's accounts of the struggles within the Admiralty and British Cabinet in formulating strategy and policy for war and the "bitter complications" of Churchill's and Fisher's fall from power. He wraps up with the essentials "the daemonic duo" did accomplish. The Australian Naval Institute forum noted an approach in which the author "distilled and weighed the rancour, political intrigue, strategic and operational challenges and the (mostly) dismal record of the war at sea up to Jutland. The well-known politicians and admirals return to life with all their proclivities – admirable and less so." British politician and military historian Keith Simpson called it "a fascinating study." A reviewer in Finest Hour: The Journal of Winston Churchill and his Times, saying the dual biography was long past due, noted the primary sources and valuable insights into the fraught partnership and complexities of the issues confronting Fisher and Churchill. The bulletin of The Churchill Project at Hillsdale College called it "a highly readable landmark study" and "a hugely important book...sure to join the shelf of vital Churchill studies." One military-website commentator, observing that Gough writes "history as literature," says this "places Dr. Gough in a distinguished company of historians who are also great and readable writers. Sir Steven Runciman, Barbara Tuchman and Sir Winston Churchill come to mind." He adds this is "likely to remain the definitive work on this subject for years to come."

The following year, research in Spanish and English archival sources became the 2018 book by Gough and Charles Borras, The War Against the Pirates: British and American Suppression of Caribbean Piracy in the Early Nineteenth Century, which examines the roots of piracy in those seas and how its suppression laid the foundation for the decline of the Spanish empire in the Americas.

The third edition of the Historical Dictionary of Canada, edited by Stephen Azzi and Barry M. Gough, was published in April 2021. This carries forward Gough's work on the 1999 original edition and 2010 second edition.

The Keith Matthews Award recognizes outstanding publications in the field of nautical research. When Possessing Meares Island won in 2022, it was the fourth time Gough's books had won it. The society's inaugural award had been given in 1985 to Gunboat Frontier: British Maritime Authority and Northwest Coast Indians, 1846–1890. In 2011 the top CNRS award went to Historical Dreadnoughts: Arthur Marder, Stephen Roskill and Battles for Naval History and in 2018 to Churchill and Fisher: Titans at the Admiralty. Evaluators noted that the research, which included newly accessible papers of both Fisher and Churchill at the Churchill Archives Centre of Cambridge University, "generated a human perspective of the pressures both faced." CNRS judges had awarded him honourable mention in 1993 for The Northwest Coast: British Navigation, Trade, and Discoveries to 1812, in 2008 for Fortune's a River: The Collision of Empires in Northwest America and in 2015 for Pax Britannica: Ruling the Waves and Keeping the Peace before Armageddon.

Gough's acount of the evolving Meares Island situation and of his own research participation with it then won the Keith Matthews Award for Best Book at the 2022 AGM of the Canadian Nautical Research Society. The CNRS citation notes that the book links "early maritime history, Indigenous land rights, and modern environmental advocacy in the Clayoquot Sound region" and "connects 18th century Indigenous-colonial trade relations to more recent historical upheavals and bridges the gap between centuries…."  The evaluation adds: "The interface of Europeans with the Nuu-chah-nulth on and around Meares Island, and the rise and fall of the sea otter trade, is the story rooted in the more distant past. But the central theme of that story re-emerges in the very recent past with the struggle over corporate logging rights and the Nuu-chah-nulth ancient claims…"

Possessing Meares Island won the 2021 Lieutenant Governor's Medal for Historical Writing, as announced at the 2022 conference of the British Columbia Historical Federation. The annual competition "recognizes the authors whose books have made the most significant contributions to the historical literature of British Columbia."

The North American Society for Oceanic History (NASOH) announced in June 2022 that for his Meares Island account, Gough had been awarded the year's John Lyman Award in Canadian Naval and Maritime History. The award recognizes excellence in the publication of books that make significant contributions to the study and understanding of maritime and naval history.

Dave Obee, editor-in-chief and publisher of the Times Colonist, described the Meares Island book as "a superb examination of a rather small location that is highly significant to British Columbia as a whole." Calling it an engaging and highly readable account, Obee commented that the book has brought together Indigenous history, maritime history, land rights and environmental issues, and that it would be hard to consider any one element without the others.

Reviewer Jason Colby commented that in the book's section "War for the Woods," Gough "tracks the history of modern logging on the BC coast, as well as the political and legal struggle over the fate of Meares Island…. In tracking the consistent Indigenous presence on and control of Meares Island, Gough is just as successful in this book as he was in his report for the legal team. And he does an exemplary job of showing how the case both reflected and contributed to changing the balance between federal and provincial views of native rights in Canada." 

Aimee Greenaway of British Columbia History managzine interviewed Gough at length about Possessing Meares Island, about the author's role in the initial legal researches and, much later, how the manuscript evolved. Writing about some of the significant people in Clayoquot Sound's long history, the historian explains how he was working with "a complicated story," one of the "multi-layered, multi-disciplinary situations" from roots back hundreds of years that affect present-day developments. 

Possessing Meares Island was also a finalist for the BC and Yukon Book Prices' Roderick Haig-Brown Regional Prize, the 2022 BC Book Awards' George Ryga Award for Social Awareness in Literature, the J.W. Dafoe Foundations's John W. Dafoe Book Prize and the 2022 City of Victoria Butler Book Prize.]

Selected bibliography 
 The Royal Navy and the Northwest Coast of North America, 1810–1914: A Study of British Maritime Ascendancy. UBC Press, 1971. .  Rev. edition, 2016.
 Canada. Modern Nations in Historical Perspective Series. Prentice Hall, 1975. .
 New Dimensions in Ethnohistory: Papers of the Second Laurier Conference on Ethnohistory and Ethnology. Huron College, University of Western Ontario, 1983. Co-edited with Laird Christie. Canadian Ethnology Service, Mercury Series Paper 120. Ottawa:  Canadian Museum of Civilization, 1991. .
 The Northwest Coast: British Navigation, Trade and Discoveries to 1812.  UBC Press, 1992. . UBC Press 1980 first edition published as Distant Dominion.
 
 British Merchantile Interests in the Making of the Peace of Paris, 1763: Trade, War and Empire. Studies in British History. Edwin Mellen Press, 1992. 
 The Falkland Islands/Malvinas: The Contest for Empire in the South Atlantic. London: Continuum, 1992/Athlone Press, 1992.  .
 ; Toronto: McClelland & Stewart, 1997. .
 "Possessing Meares Island," The Journal of Canadian Studies 33, no. 2 (Summer 1998), 177–85.
 
 Geography and Exploration: Biographical Portraits. Vol. 4, Scribner Science Reference Series. Princeton, N.J.: Charles Scribner's Sons, 2002. .
 
 Britain, Canada and the North Pacific: Maritime Enterprise and Dominion, 1778-1914. Ashgate Variorum, 2004. .
 "From Nootka Sound to Trafalgar: Commodore Dionisio Alcalá Galiano," in Emilio Soler Pascual, ed., Trafalgar y Alcalá Galiano, Jornadas internacionales, Cabra, 17 al 23 de octobre de 2005. Madrid: Agencia Española de Cooperación Internacional, 2006.
 Fortune's a River: The Collision of Empires in Northwest America. Harbour Publishing, 2007. .
 HMCS Haida: Anatomy of a Destroyer. Vanwell Publishing/Looking Back Press, 2009. 
 Historical Dreadnoughts: Arthur Marder, Stephen Roskill and Battles for Naval History. Seaforth/Pen & Sword, 2010. .
 Introduction to Andrew David, ed., William Robert Broughton's Voyage of Discovery to the North Pacific 1795–1798.  Hakluyt Society, 2010. .
 Juan de Fuca's Strait: Voyages in the Waterway of Forgotten Dreams. Madeira Park: Harbour Publishing, 2012. .
 "A Tangle of Rock and Moving Water: William Broughton's 1792 Exploration of the San Juan Archipelago," Columbia 27, no. 4 (Winter 2013–14), 20–7.
 From Classroom to Battlefield: Victoria High School and the First World War. Heritage House Publishing, 2014. .
 The Elusive Mr. Pond: The Soldier, Fur Trader and Explorer Who Opened the Northwest. Douglas & McIntyre, 2014. .
 Pax Britannica: Ruling the Waves and Keeping the Peace before Armageddon. Palgrave Macmillan, 2014.  .
 Britannia's Navy on the West Coast of North America, 1812–1914. Heritage House Publishing, 2016. .
 "The Caneing in Conduit Street," Trafalgar Chronicle: Journal of the 1805 Club 25 (2015), 201–12.
 That Hamilton Woman: Emma and Nelson.  Seaforth Publishing, 2016 , in conjunction with the exhibition Emma Hamilton: Seduction and Celebrity, 3 Nov 2016 – 17 Apr 2017, National Maritime Museum, Greenwich; and Annapolis, MD: Naval Institute Press, 2016. .
 "Writing a Canadian High School History of the Great War: Victoria High School: Challenges, Pitfall, and Sources." Canadian Military History 25 (no. 1), article 13 (2016).
 "Charles Duncan, Cape Flattery, and the Strait of Juan de Fuca: A Voyage to the Waterway of Forgotten Dreams," Terrae Incognitae: The Journal of the Society for the History of Discoveries 49:1 (April 2017), 37–49; retrieved 25 April 2017 at https://www.tandfonline.com/doi/abs/10.1080/00822884.2017.1295597?journalCode=ytin20/.
 Churchill and Fisher: Titans at the Admiralty. In the U.K., Seaforth/Pen & Sword, 2017; in the U.S., Naval Institute Press, 2017 ; in Canada, James Lorimer Ltd., 2017 .
 Barry Gough and Charles Borras. The War Against the Pirates: British and American Suppression of Caribbean Piracy in the Early Nineteenth Century. London: Palgrave Macmillan, 2018. ; eBook 
  2nd ed., Scarecrow Press, October 2010. 3rd ed., Stephen Azzi and Barry M. Gough, eds. Rowman & Littlefield, April 2021. ,  eBook.
 "Exploration and Empire," Canada's History, April–May 2022, pp. 38–47
 Possessing Meares Island: A Historian's Journey into the Past of Clayoquot Sound. Madeira Park: Harbour Publishing, 2021.  (hc),  (EPUB).

See also
 Churchill College, Cambridge

References

External links 
 North American Studies
 HMCS Haida
 Imperial and Commonwealth History
 Association for Canadian Studies in the United States

1938 births
Living people
20th-century Canadian historians
Canadian naval historians
Canadian maritime historians
Canadian male non-fiction writers
War of 1812
Historians of Canada
Academic staff of the Royal Military College of Canada
Writers from Victoria, British Columbia
University of British Columbia alumni
University of Montana alumni
Alumni of King's College London
Fellows of King's College London
21st-century Canadian historians